The following is a list of private schools in Iowa arranged alphabetically by county name.

A 
 St. Patrick School (Allamakee County) (K-6)

B 

 Central Lutheran School (Benton County) (PK-8)
 St Athanasius School (Buchanan County) (K-8)
 Storm Lake St. Mary's School (Buena Vista County) (K-12)

Black Hawk County

 Cedar Valley Catholic Schools 
 Blessed Maria Assunta Pollota Catholic Middle School (6-8)
 Blessed Sacrament Early Childhood Center (PK)
 Columbus Catholic High School (9-12)
 St. Edward Elementary School (K-5)
 Don Bosco High School (9-12)
 St. Patrick Catholic School (K-12)
 Valley Lutheran School (K-12)
 Waterloo Christian School (K-12)

Boone County

 Sacred Heart School (K-8)
 Trinity Lutheran School (PK-8)

Bremer County

 Community Lutheran School (K-8)
 St Paul's Lutheran School (PK-8)

Buchanan County

 St. John Catholic School (PK-8)

C 

 Kuemper Catholic School (Carroll County) (K-12)
 Scattergood Friends School, (Cedar County) (6-12)
 St. Joseph Community School (Chickasaw County) (K-8)
 St. Mary Immaculate Conception School (Clayton County) (K-8)
 Prince of Peace Catholic School (Clinton County) (PK-12)
 St. Rose Of Lima School (Crawford County) (PK-5)

Cerro Gordo County

 Newman Catholic School (K-12)
 North Iowa Christian School (Cerro Gordo County) (K-12)

Clay County

 Sacred Heart Catholic School - Spencer (K-6)
 Iowa Great Lakes Lutheran School (K-6)

D 

 St. Patrick's School (Dallas County) (K-8)
 St. Mary's School (Delaware County)
 Notre Dame School (Des Moines County) (K-12)

Dubuque County

 Aquin Catholic School (K-8)
 Beckman Catholic High School (9-12)
 Holy Family Catholic Schools
 Holy Family Early Childhood Center (PK)
 Mazzuchelli Catholic Middle School (6-8)
 Resurrection Elementary School (PK-5)
 St. Anthony/Our Lady of Guadalupe Spanish Immersion Program (PK-5)
 St. Columbkille Elementary School (PK-5)
 Wahlert High School (9-12)
 St. Francis Xavier Elementary School (PK-6)
 Seton Catholic School (PK-8)

F 

 Immaculate Conception School (Floyd County) (PK-6)
 St. Paul's Lutheran School (Franklin County) (K-8)

H-I 

 St. Thomas Aquinas School (Hamilton County) (PK-6)
 Timothy Christian School (Hardin County) (K-8)
 St. Mary Catholic School (Humboldt County) (PK-6)
 Lutheran Interparish School (Iowa County) (PK-8)

Howard County

 Notre Dame Catholic School (PK-6)
 Trinity Catholic School (K-8)

J-K 
 Maharishi School (Jefferson County) (K-12)

Jackson County

 Marquette Catholic School System
 Marquette High School (9-12)
 St Joseph's Elementary School (K-8)
 Sacred Heart School (Jackson County) (PK-6)

Jasper County

 Newton Christian School (PK-8)
 Sully Christian School (K-8)

Johnson County

 Hillcrest Academy (9-12)
 Regina Catholic Education Center (PK-12)
 Heritage Christian School (PK-8)
 Faith Academy (K-6)

Jones County

 St. Patrick School (PK-6)
 Sacred Heart Grade School (PK-4)

Kossuth County

 Bishop Garrigan Catholic Schools
 Bishop Garrigan High School (9-12)
 Garrigan Grade Schools (3-6, 7-8)
 Seton Early Childhood (PK)
 Seton Grade School (K-2)

L 
 Inwood Christian School (Lyon County) (K-8)

Lee County

 Holy Trinity Catholic Schools (K-12)
 Keokuk Catholic Schools/St. Vincent's School (PK-5)

Linn County

 Cedar Valley Christian School (PK-12)
 Isaac Newton Christian Academy (PK-12)
 Summit Schools (PK-8)
 Trinity Lutheran School (PK-8)
 Xavier Catholic Schools
 All Saints Elementary School (PK-5)
 LaSalle Catholic Elementary School (PK-4)
 LaSalle Catholic Middle School (5-8)
 Regis Middle School (6-8)
 St. Joseph School (PK-8)
 St. Matthew School (PK-5)
 St. Pius X School (PK-5)
 Xavier High School

M-O 

 Oskaloosa Christian Schools (Mahaska County) (K-8)
 St. Francis of Assisi School (Marshall County) (PK-8)
 SS. Mary & Mathias Catholic School (Muscatine County)

Marion County

 Peoria Christian School (PK-8)
 Pella Christian Grade School (K-8)
 Pella Christian High School (9-12)

O'Brien County

 Sanborn Christian School (PK-8)
 St. Patrick's School (PK-8)
 Sheldon Christian School (PK-8)
 Zion-St. John Lutheran School (PK-8)

P 

 Clarinda Lutheran School (Page County) (K-8)
 Emmetsburg Catholic School (Palo Alto County) (PK-8)
 Pocahontas Catholic School (Pocahontas County) (K-5)
 Central Iowa Christian School (Poweshiek County) (K-8)

Plymouth County

 Gehlen Catholic School (K-12)
 Remsen St. Mary's Schools(PK-12)

Polk County

 Ankeny Christian Academy (PK-12)
 Bergman Academy (PK-8)
 Christ The King School (PK-8)
 Des Moines Adventist School (K-8)
 Des Moines Christian School (PK-12)
 Dowling Catholic High School (9-12)
 Grand View Christian School (PK-12)
 Holy Family School (PK-8)
 Holy Trinity School (PK-8)
 Joshua Christian Academy (K-12)
 Mount Olive Lutheran School (PK-8)
 Sacred Heart School (PK-8)
 St. Anthony School (PK-8)
 St. Augustin School (PK-8)
 St. Joseph Elementary School (PK-8)
 St. Pius X School (PK-8)
 St. Theresa School (PK-8)

Pottawattamie County

 Saint Albert Catholic Schools (PK-12)
 Heartland Christian School (PK-12)

S 

 Shelby County Catholic School (Shelby County) (PK-5)
 St. Cecilia School (Story County) (PK-5)

Scott County

 All Saints Catholic School (PK-8)
 Assumption High School (9-12)
 John F. Kennedy Catholic School (PK-8)
 Lourdes Catholic School (PK-8)
 Quad City Montessori School (PK-6)
 Rivermont Collegiate (PK-12)
 St. Paul the Apostle Catholic School (PK-8)
 Trinity Lutheran School (PK-8)

Sioux County

 Hull Christian School (PK-8)
 Hull Protestant Reformed Christian School (K-8) 
 Ireton Christian School (PK-8)
 Netherlands Reformed Christian School (PK-12)
 Orange City Christian School (PK-8)
 Rock Valley Christian School (PK-8)
 Sioux Center Christian School (PK-8)
 Spalding Catholic School (K-6)
 Trinity Christian High School (9-12)
 Unity Christian High School (9-12)
  Western Christian High School (9-12)

U-W 

 St. Malachy School (Union County) (PK-8)
 Seton Catholic School (Wapello County) (PK-5)
 St. James Elementary School (Washington County) (PK-5)
 Scarville Lutheran School (Winnebago County) (PK-7)

Webster County

 St. Edmond School (K-12)
 St. Paul Lutheran School (PK-8)
 Community Christian School (PK-8)

Winneshiek County

 Calmar Festina Spillville Catholic School (PK-8)
 St. Benedict Catholic School (PK-8)
 St. Teresa of Calcutta Catholic School (PK-8)

Woodbury County

 Bishop Heelan Schools
 Bishop Heelan Catholic High School (9-12)
 Dual Language Academy (PK-2)
 Holy Cross School (PK-8)
 Mater Dei School (PK-8)
 Sacred Heart School (PK-8)
 Danbury Catholic School (PK-6)
 St. Paul's Lutheran School (PK-5)
 Siouxland Christian School (PK-12)

See also 
List of school districts in Iowa
List of high schools in Iowa
Wikipedia:WikiProject Missing encyclopedic articles/High schools/US/Iowa

Private